Khanderao Dabhade (Marathi: खंडेराव दाभाडे) is the founding patriarch of the Sarsenapati Dabhade family of Talegaon Dabhade. He was the eldest of the two sons of Yesaji Dabhade (Bodyguard of the Maratha King, Shivaji) and the grandson of Bajaji Dabhade. He was conferred the hereditary title of Sardar Senapati (or Sarsenapati, Commander-in-chief, Duke) by Shahuji, the grandson of Shivaji on 11 January 1717.
]

Life

Khanderao Dabhade was an accomplished Sardar of the Maratha Empire.  Most notably, from 1705–1716, Sardar Khanderao Dabhade led the Maratha Empire forces in Baroda. After his return to Satara, he was made Senapati on 11 January 1717.

Khanderao Dabhade died at Juna Rajwada in Talegaon Dabhade near Pune, Maharashtra on 27 September 1729. His widow, Sarsenapati Umabai Dabhade, was the first and only woman to become Commander-in-Chief of the Maratha forces in 1732. 

Khanderao Dabhade built the Induri Fort also famous as the 'Sarsenapati Dabhade Gadhi' at Induri in 1720–21.
The Samadhi of Sarsenapati Khanderao Dabhade is situated at the Shrimant Sarsenapati Dabhade Baneshwar Mandir in Talegaon Dabhade.

Induri Fort is also famous as the 'Sarsenapati Dabhade Gaadi' (seat of power) at Induri in 1720–21. The Samadhi of Sarsenapati Khanderao Dabhade is situated at the Shrimant Sarsenapati Dabhade Baneshwar Mandir in Talegaon Dabhade. The current Srimant is Abhishek Mande Bhot, who ascended upon the 'Gaadi' in 1990 upon turning 15.

The photo of the original wall painting of Sarsenapati Khanderao Dabhade from the walls of the Old Rajwada at Talegaon Dabhade.

Legacy

The Deccan College in Pune, the third oldest educational institution in India, was founded by the Dakshina Fund bequeathed by Sarsenapati Khanderao Dabhade. In 1821, the Dakshina Fund was named the Hindoo College by Mountstuart Elephistone, the Governor of Bombay Presidency. In 1864, the College was renamed as Deccan College as it serves the whole Deccan region of India.

References
Notes

Bibliography

Year of birth missing
Indian nobility
1729 deaths
People from Talegaon